Imison is a surname, and may refer to:

John Imison (died 1788), English mechanic and printer
Michael Imison (born 1935), British television director and literary agent 
Rachel Imison (born 1978), Australian field hockey player
Richard Imison (1936–1993), British radio script editor
Tamsyn Imison (1937-2017), British educator, wife of Michael Imison